Mbara may refer to:

 Mbara people, an Australian Aboriginal group
 Mbara language (Australia), an extinct Australian Aboriginal language
 Mbara language (Chad), an Afro-Asiatic language of Chad
 Augustine Mbara, Zimbabwean footballer

See also
 Mbarara, a city in the Western Region of Uganda

Language and nationality disambiguation pages